Kouros is a type of Ancient Greek sculpture, which represents a naked male youth.

Kouros may also refer to:

Kroisos Kouros, a marble kouros from Anavyssos in Attica
Blond Kouros's Head of the Acropolis, head of a lost marble statue of a young man now in the Acropolis Museum in Athens
Getty kouros, an over-life-sized dolomitic marble statue bought by the J. Paul Getty Museum
Kouros of Tenea, the grave statue of a youth from Tenea

Persons
Kouros Shahmiri, an Iranian famous singer (solo and as part of Andy & Kouros)
Alexis Kouros, a Finnish writer, documentary-maker, director and producer
Yiannis Kouros, Greek ultramarathon runner based in Melbourne, Australia
Christopher Kouros, actor

Various
 Kouros (perfume), a fragrance marketed by Yves Saint Laurent

See also
Kourosh (disambiguation)